Stranger is the fifth studio album by the American rock band Valient Thorr. It was released on September 14, 2010.

Track listing
 "Gillionaire" - 3:02
 "Sleeper Awakes" - 3:16
 "Disappearer" - 3:08
 "Double Crossed" - 4:19
 "Night Terrors" 4:51
 "Sudden Death Is Nothing" - 4:34
 "Woman in the Woods" - 3:01
 "Vision Quest" - 3:30
 "Habituary" - 3:15
 "The Recognition" - 1:16
 "Without Hope, Without Fear" - 3:36
 "Future Humans" - 3:26

References

External links
http://volcoment.com/eCom/details.asp?cid=3&sid=&pid=595

2010 albums
Valient Thorr albums
Volcom Entertainment albums
Albums produced by Jack Endino